KNKT may refer to:

 KNKT (FM), a radio station (90.7 FM) licensed to serve Cannon Air Force Base, New Mexico, United States
 KYFV, a radio station (107.1 FM) licensed to serve Armijo, New Mexico, which held the call sign KNKT from 1994 to 2021
 Marine Corps Air Station Cherry Point (ICAO code KNKT)
 National Transportation Safety Committee